The Okhla Vihar metro station is located on the Magenta Line of the Delhi Metro. It is located in Abul Fazal Enclave just behind Jamia Nagar Police station. This Metro station has three gates. One named as Abul Fazal Enclave Part-I another Hari Kothi Road and the last one as Jamia Nagar Police Station.

As part of Phase III of Delhi Metro, Okhla Vihar is the metro station of the Magenta Line

History

This station is constructed on the acquired green land of Uttar Pradesh's Irrigation Department, for which hundreds of trees were cut for construction.

Construction
The construction began in 2014 and the construction contractor was Afcons Infrastructure Limited.

The station

Structure
Okhla Vihar elevated metro station situated on the Magenta Line of Delhi Metro.

Station layout

Facilities
List of available ATM at Okhla Vihar metro station are

ICICI Bank ATMCanara Bank ATM (300m)Union Bank ATM (200m)

Delhi Metro's dedicated Police station 'Okhla Vihar Metro Police Station' is on the ground floor of this metro station in addition to adjoining Jamia Nagar Police Station.

Connections
Okhla Bus Terminas of Delhi Transport Corporation is adjoining along with Auto Rishshaw Stand.

Bus
Delhi Transport Corporation's Okhla Bus Terminus is adjoining

Entry/Exit

See also

Delhi
List of Delhi Metro stations
Transport in Delhi
Delhi Metro Rail Corporation
Delhi Suburban Railway
Delhi Monorail
Delhi Transport Corporation
Noida
Okhla Sanctuary
Okhla barrage
Kalindi Kunj
National Capital Region (India)
List of rapid transit systems
List of metro systems

References

External links

 Delhi Metro Rail Corporation Ltd. (Official site) 
 Delhi Metro Annual Reports
 
 UrbanRail.Net – descriptions of all metro systems in the world, each with a schematic map showing all stations.

Delhi Metro stations
Railway stations in India opened in 2017
Railway stations in South East Delhi district